Elias Rudolph Camerarius Sr.  (1641–1695) was a professor of medicine who notably wrote books on the palpitations of the heart, pleurisy, skull fractures, and the use of medicinal plants.

He obtained his Doctor of Medicine (MD) in 1663 at the University of Tübingen.

References
 
 Allgemeine Deutsche Biographie, Duncker & Humblot, 1967-1971 Reprint, vol. 3, p. 719.
 Biographisches Lexikon der hervorragenden Ärzte, Urban & Schwarzenberg, 1962, vol. 1, p. 808.
 Michaud Biographie Universelle, (2nd Ed.), Delagrabe, 1843–1865, vol. 6, p. 474.

1641 births
1695 deaths
17th-century German physicians
17th-century German writers
17th-century German male writers